SmartLynx Airlines Limited, previously LatCharter, is a Latvia-based ACMI, charter and cargo airline based in Mārupe, operating flights on wet lease out (ACMI), holiday charter flights, ad-hoc passenger charter and cargo flights across Europe, Africa, Asia, Australia, Canada and the USA.

History

The privately owned company started operations in 1993 with a leased Tupolev Tu-134B. In 2001, the Tupolev fleet was replaced with the larger Yakovlev Yak-42 and in 2003, first Airbus A320-200 was inducted into the service on behalf of the airline.

In 2006, Loftleiðir, the aircraft lease arm of Icelandair Group, acquired a majority 55% shareholding in the LatCharter stock, and eventually the whole company.

In 2007, the airline expanded its fleet by adding five more A320-200s and two 767-300s. The aircraft were wet-leased to different airlines around the world. Since then, the ACMI market has been the company's primary focus, having operated for numerous carriers such as Air Malta, SBA Airlines, Finnair, Condor. In 2008, the company was renamed SmartLynx Airlines.

In 2012, the airline was bought from Icelandair in a management buy-out also forming a single aircraft subsidiary Smartlynx Airlines Estonia to serve Estonian tour operators. In 2014, SmartLynx transitioned into a paperless cockpit environment by using the Jeppesen FliteDeck Pro app as its electronic flight bag (EFB).

In 2016, the company was bought by a Netherlands-based investment fund. 

In June 2016, Zygimantas Surintas was appointed as the company’s CEO.

In 2019, the airline established a subsidiary in Malta (SmartLynx Malta). SmartLynx Airlines also became a part of Avia Solutions Group in 2019. 

In 2020, the airline expanded into air cargo transportation. In February 2021, SmartLynx and DHL signed a partnership agreement. The partnership included two of SmartLynx Malta A321-200s transporting freight and goods on behalf of the Deutsche Post subsidiary. 

In October 2021, SmartLynx announced the establishment of an in-house line maintenance centre, SmartLynx Technik. SmartLynx also leased several Airbus A320 aircraft to Nigerian airline Air Peace in November 2021. In December 2021, the airlines announced plans to open a new office in Vilnius, Lithuania. 

In February 2022, SmartLynx Airlines signed an agreement with SMBC Aviation Capital to lease the first two Boeing 737 MAX 8 aircraft.  In March 2022, SmartLynx announced the introduction of first Airbus A330-300  freighters to its fleet after signing an agreement with Air Transport Services Group.  

SmartLynx also formed partnerships with airlines such as British airline EasyJet, leasing several aircraft to EasyJet in June 2022. In October 2022, SmartLynx also announced it was adding four Airbus A321F freighters to its fleet, with plans to have 20 A321F aircraft by the end of 2023. The four new aircraft were acquired through a freighter conversion programme in partnership with Aero Capital Solutions.

In 2022, SmartLynx Airlines also celebrated its 30th anniversary.

Training centre
SmartLynx Training Centre is an approved training organization (ATO) in the Baltic States, providing type rating courses for Airbus A320 family and Boeing 737 MAX 8 aircraft.

Fleet

, SmartLynx Airlines fleet - including all subsidiaries - consists of the following aircraft:

See also
List of airlines of Latvia

References

External links

Airlines of Latvia
Airlines established in 1992
Icelandair
Latvian companies established in 1992